Hartert's leaf warbler (Phylloscopus goodsoni) is a leaf warbler found only in China.  Its natural habitats are temperate forests and subtropical or tropical moist lowland forests.  It was previously considered a subspecies of Blyth's leaf warbler.

References

Olsson, U., P. Alström, P.G.P. Ericson, and P. Sundberg. 2005. Non-monophyletic taxa and cryptic species - evidence from a molecular phylogeny of leaf-warblers (Phylloscopus, Aves). Molecular Phylogenetics and Evolution 36: 261–276.
Rheindt, F.E. 2006. Splits galore: the revolution in Asian leaf warbler systematics. BirdingASIA 5: 25-39

Hartert's leaf warbler
Birds of South China
Endemic birds of China
Hartert's leaf warbler
Taxonomy articles created by Polbot